Lake is a 2021 graphic adventure game developed by Gamious and published by Whitethorn Games. The game was released on September 1, 2021, for Microsoft Windows, Xbox One and Xbox Series X/S. It was later released for the PlayStation 4 and PlayStation 5 on April 8, 2022, and on Google Stadia on June 1, 2022.

The gameplay of Lake features elements of story-driven point-and-click adventure games and driving simulation games. Set in 1986, its story follows an IT professional named Meredith Weiss who spends two weeks in her hometown, the fictional Oregon town of Providence Oaks, where she temporarily assumes the role of the town's mail carrier. As Meredith, the player interacts with the various residents of Providence Oaks, either reconnecting with longtime residents or meeting new people, while delivering mail to them over the course of the fortnight. The player has the option to build romantic relationships between Meredith and certain non-player characters. By the end of the game, the player must decide whether Meredith will return to her career in the big city, or stay in the quiet town she grew up in.

Lake received mixed or average reviews. Critics generally gave positive feedback about the game's characters, quality of writing, and laid-back setting, but criticized its repetitive gameplay and technical issues.

Gameplay 
Lake is a graphic adventure game played from a third-person perspective as Meredith Weiss, a middle-aged IT professional who returns to her hometown of  Providence Oaks, Oregon for a short stay. The player must drive a mail delivery truck and deliver letters of correspondence and packages to their intended recipients over a two-week period. The player may freely explore various locations in Providence Oaks and complete a predetermined number of deliveries in any given order before returning to the post office, which triggers the end of the driving segment for the day. It is not possible for the player to commit any acts of violence in Lake. As Meredith, the player interacts with non-player characters during delivery runs or after work hours. Branching dialogue choices are occasionally presented during conversations, which may influence the nature and tone of Meredith's relationships with the characters she encounters.

Plot 
On September 1, 1986, Meredith Weiss arrives at her hometown of Providence Oaks and stays at her parents' residence while they are away on a holiday trip, intending to take a short break from her hectic career at an American software company. To pass the time, she fills in for her father Thomas, the local mail carrier, for two weeks. Meredith may interact with up to 20 of the town's residents during her time in Providence Oaks, including her father's colleague Frank Coleman, the local postmaster; her estranged childhood best friend Kay Evans; Kay's aunt Maureen Hennessy, the proprietor of the local diner; the elderly Mildred Jenkins, who keeps many cats; and Lori Young, the local mechanic's daughter. Meredith may also establish a romantic relationship with one of the game's two love interests: Angie Eastman, the owner of a VHS rental shop, and Robert Harris, a lumberjack and environmental activist.

By the game's end, the player must decide whether Meredith will stay on permanently in Providence Oaks and take over her father's position as the town's full-time mail carrier, or accept a partnership offer from her boss Steve Mitchell in the software company and return to her life in the big city. Each of these main endings has several versions, depending on the player's choices. A third main ending becomes available if the player's choices led to Meredith owning an RV: She can go on a road trip. If Meredith owns the RV and is in a relationship with Angie, the couple can decide to depart from Providence Oaks and commit to an itinerant lifestyle.

Development and release 
Lake was developed by Dutch video game developers Gamious. Dylan Nagel, the game director, came up with the basic concept of Lake. In 2017, Nagel pitched the project using just a picture of a car driving around a lake, and said he would like to have a nice quiet drive around in it. This resonated with his colleagues at Gamious, who collectively decided that they would want to create a relaxing, lighthearted in-game world for players to escape from the hectic pace of modern city life. Several other titles for the game were considered; consensus decided on Lake due to the connotation of its "simple and carefree vibe". The studio had some concerns about the title's perceived weakness when it comes to marketing efforts that rely on search engine optimization, but decided against a later title change as a significant number of news articles about the game had already been published. Gamious' original goal was to complete development of the project, which was largely self-financed, within one and a half years; the studio ended up taking nearly four years.

The team wanted to present Lake as a laid-back, relaxing video game experience with a sincere and mature narrative; its lead writer Jos Bouman described Lake as the "anti-GTA" due to its lack of confrontation or stakes. The 1980s were chosen as the time period for the game because the team felt a nostalgic longing for a time when "things were simpler and meeting people played a more central role" in society.  Bouman cited Gilmore Girls, Twin Peaks and First Blood as reference points which inspired Providence Oaks, because they are considered to be comparable settings which ought to be widely familiar to consumers of American popular culture. As part of the design process for Providence Oaks, the game's technical environment artist Jonathan van Immerzeel did extensive research through Google Maps and from referring to books about trees in the state of Oregon and in the Pacific Northwest region.

By June 2021, Lake was confirmed for a September 1, 2021 launch date for Windows, Xbox One and Xbox Series X/S.
 A demo was made available during the ID@Xbox Summer Game Fest Demo event at E3 2021. Following its September 1, 2021 release, Lake was added to Microsoft's Xbox Game Pass service on December 16, 2021. The PlayStation 4 and PlayStation 5 versions of the game were released on April 8, 2022. A physical edition for the PlayStation versions of Lake, which includes an A3-sized map of Providence Oaks, was also released for retailers worldwide. It is distributed by Perp Games, in partnership with the nonprofit NGO Eden Reforestation Projects.

Reception 

Lake received "mixed or average" reviews for most platforms according to review aggregator Metacritic; the PlayStation 5 version received "generally favorable" reviews.

Lake received particular attention for its LGBT themes, especially the subplot involving Meredith and Angie. It received nominations for Best LGBTQ Indie Game and Best LGBTQ Character at the Gayming Awards 2022.

Lake was also named one of the twelve best games of 2021 by The New Yorker and was nominated for three Dutch Game Awards in the categories Best Game, Best Game Design, Best Innovation. 

Jorge Jimenez from IGN and David Smith from Kotaku Australia highlighted the game's handling of midlife crisis as a major narrative theme.

Notes

References

External links 
Official website

2021 video games
Adventure games
Indie video games
LGBT-related video games
Midlife crisis in fiction
PlayStation 4 games
PlayStation 5 games
Single-player video games
Video games developed in the Netherlands
Video games featuring female protagonists
Video games set in Oregon
Video games set in 1986
Video games with alternate endings
Windows games
Xbox One games
Xbox Series X and Series S games